Grandberry is a surname. Notable people with the name include:

 Ken Grandberry (1952–2022), American football running back
 Omari Grandberry (born 1984), stage name Omarion, American R&B singer, songwriter, actor and dancer

See also
 Grandberry Crossroads, Alabama, United States, unincorporated community in Henry County
 Grandberry Park, Minami, Japan; location of Minami-machida Grandberry Park Station
 Granberry, surname
 Granbery, surname